Graffiti is a 2006 Russian comedy-drama film directed by Igor Apasyan.

Plot 
The film tells about an artist doing his favorite thing. He is painting graffiti on the walls of the metropolitan subway. Suddenly, bikers attack him, as a result of which he loses a trip to Italy. Instead, he goes to paint in the province, where he expects a lot of new adventures.

Cast 
 Andrei Novikov as Andrey Dragunov
 Viktor Perevalov as Klizya
 Sergey Potapov as Mityay
 Larisa Guzeeva as Mariya
 Aleksandr Ilyin as Miron Sysoevich
 Olga Yurasova as Hostes in hotel

References

External links 
 

2006 films
2000s Russian-language films
Russian comedy-drama films
2006 comedy-drama films